The Cathedral Basilica of the Assumption of Our Lady (also called Győr Cathedral) is a Catholic church that serves as cathedral basilica in Győr, Hungary, being the seat of the Diocese of Győr.

The early 11th-century Romanesque church was destroyed by the Mongols and rebuilt from the thirteenth to the fifteenth century. After the expulsion of the Turks, the interior was redesigned between 1635 and 1650 by the Italian master Giovanni Battista Rava in early Baroque style. The tower was completed only in 1680. The construction of the church lasted until the 1770s. The last restoration was carried out between 1968 and 1972. In 1997, the cathedral obtained the status of minor basilica, awarded by Pope John Paul II.

Pulpit

The pulpit belongs to the same period wirh the interior when the most important Baroque features were added under Bishop Count Ferenc Zichy in the 1770s. Its architect and sculptor remains unknown but it is attributed to Melchior Hefele. The classicizing late Baroque structure was built at the first pillar of the nave on the left side. It was made of red marble with a marble side stair supported by a pillar; the main support forms a Doric column with a fluted shaft. 

The pulpit itself is shaped like a shell with a solid parapet articulated by panels and pilasters and decorated with gilt wooden carvings of rosettes, bay leaf garlands and acanthus leaves. The wrought-iron railing was made in 1783 by a craftsman who carved the date and his initials (J. K.) into the doorway post. The railing and the door are richly decorated with roses, garlands, leaves and bows. The abat-voix is painted woodwork with dark yellow marbleizing, decorated with rosettes, brackets and leaves. On the underside there is a silvery dove surrounded by a meander strip; on the top an allegorical female statue representing the Church is holding a chalice and a church model. The canopy-like base of the statue is decorated with wreathes and it is surrounded by four putti holding the Tablets of Stone and the cross, flanked by flowering urns. The statues of the abat-voix were created in a more traditional Baroque style than the other parts of the pulpit, which show the growing influence of Neoclassicism.

See also
 Roman Catholicism in Hungary
 List of cathedrals in Hungary
 Assumption Cathedral (disambiguation), other cathedrals with the same dedication

References

Roman Catholic cathedrals in Hungary
Buildings and structures in Győr
Roman Catholic churches completed in 1770
Basilica churches in Hungary
18th-century Roman Catholic church buildings in Hungary